For an explanation of the French peerage, see the article Peerage of France. Note that peerages and titles were distinct, and the date given for the extinction of the peerage is not necessarily the same as that of the extinction of the title. For more on noble titles and distinctions, see French nobility.

The "old peerages"
The dates of the creation of the twelve peerages are obscure.

The "new peerages" (1259–1789)

House of Capet

House of Valois

House of Bourbon

Sources 
 http://www.heraldica.org/topics/france

Lists of peerages
 
Lists of French nobility
European peerage

pt:Pariato da França